Wanna be a bride is a popular Egyptian book by Ghada Abdel Aal based on a blog of the same name about the several (failed) marriage proposals the author has gone through. The book was published by the Egyptian printing house Shorouk in 2008. The book has a comic tone and addresses the author's thoughts and feelings during each failed marriage proposal that she has received. The book also covers the issue of the late age of marriage in Egypt due to economic reasons.

The author
Ghada Abdel Aal (born 21 December 1978, El-Mahalla El-Kubra) works as a pharmacist. She also wrote the screenplay of 2 TV series. She introduces herself on her blog as

Translations

Reception
Both the book and the blog are popular among young Egyptians (both males and females). A TV series starring Hend Sabri was made in 2010. The book has received positive reviews and was covered in the Egyptian media in popular talk shows  and newspapers (e.g. Almasry Alyoum, Los Angeles Times, la Repubblica, The Independent).

References

External links
Wanna be a bride, the Arabic blog
Che il velo sia da sposa!, the Italian blog
Ghada Abdel Aal and her Book I Want to Get Married!: From Anonymous Blogger to Bestselling Author Qantara.de

2008 non-fiction books
Egyptian books